Thomas Stanley Bloxham (born 1 November 2003) is an English professional footballer who plays as a forward for Shrewsbury Town.

Early and personal life 
Bloxham was born in Leicester, England. He was educated at Countesthorpe college, a public school in the East Midlands. He played football for the school whilst attending.

Career 
Bloxham is a youth product of Leicester City from the ages of 8 to 14, and had a stint with his local club Aylestone Park before signing with Shrewsbury Town's youth academy. He made his professional debut with Shrewsbury Town in a 1–0 EFL League One loss to Lincoln City F.C. on 27 April 2021. He scored his first senior goal for the club on 28 August 2021, scoring a 59th-minute equaliser in a 2–1 win at home to Gillingham, the club's first league goal of the season. Tom scored his second goal for the club after coming on as a late substitute against Stratford Town in the FA cup first round 2 months later.

References

External links
 

2003 births
Living people
Sportspeople from Oswestry
English footballers
Association football forwards
Shrewsbury Town F.C. players
English Football League players
People educated at Oswestry School